Pedro Ferrándiz González (20 November 1928 – 7 July 2022) was a Spanish basketball coach. He is most famous for coaching Real Madrid basketball club in the 1960s and 1970s. The International Olympic Committee awarded him the Olympic Order in 1977.

Ferrándiz was born in Alicante. He was made an inductee of the Basketball Hall of Fame in April 2007. In 2008, he was named one of the 50 Greatest EuroLeague Contributors. He was inducted into the FIBA Hall of Fame in 2009.

Coaching career 
Ferrándiz holds a record 12 titles in the Spanish League, 4 titles in the FIBA European Champions Cup (now called EuroLeague) and 11 titles in the Spanish King's Cup. His combined record, while coaching Real, was 437–90. He recorded three undefeated Spanish League seasons. He was the AEEB Spanish Coach of the Year in 1975.

He was the head coach of the senior Spain national basketball team, from 1964 to 1965. He coached Spain at the EuroBasket 1965.

He died in 2022, aged 93.

Titles won 
 4× FIBA European Champions Cup (EuroLeague) Champion: 1964–65, 1966–67, 1967–68, 1973–74
 12× Spanish League Champion: 1960, 1961, 1962, 1965, 1968, 1969, 1970, 1971, 1972, 1973, 1974, 1975
 11× Spanish King's Cup Winner: 1960, 1961, 1962, 1965, 1967, 1970, 1971, 1972, 1973, 1974, 1975

See also 
 List of EuroLeague-winning head coaches

References

External links 
 Pedro Ferrandiz Foundation
 Basketball Hall of Fame Ferrandiz Profile
 FIBA Hall of Fame Ferrandiz Profile

1928 births
2022 deaths
EuroLeague-winning coaches
FIBA Hall of Fame inductees
Naismith Memorial Basketball Hall of Fame inductees
Real Madrid Baloncesto players
Real Madrid basketball coaches
Recipients of the Olympic Order
Spanish men's basketball players
Spanish basketball coaches
Basketball players from Madrid
Sportspeople from Alicante